Paolo Santiago Ríos Vargas (born 14 February 2000) is a Mexican professional footballer who plays as a midfielder for MLS Next Pro club Houston Dynamo 2.

Career statistics

Club

Notes

References

2000 births
Living people
Mexican footballers
Association football midfielders
Club América footballers
Liga MX players
MLS Next Pro players